Aniam is an Israeli settlement organized as a moshav, located in the Golan Heights. The settlement was built in 1978 and falls under the municipal jurisdiction of the Golan Regional Council.

The international community considers Israeli settlements in the Golan Heights illegal under international law, but the Israeli government disputes this.

Etymology
The name Ani'am is derived from a member of the Menashe tribe (1 Chronicles 7:19), whose tribal area included the Golan Heights.

Economy
The economy of Ani'am is based on the provision of engineering services, on agriculture (mango, citrus vines and grapes for the production of wine and flowers) and the raising of Merino sheep. The village also has a distribution board factory. Many artists have settled in Ani'am and have created the "Artists' boulevard" in the settlement, with art galleries where each artist has built a structure unique to his or her artistic style. There are also boutiques, a pub-restaurant as well as guest cabins in Ani'am.

See also
Israeli-occupied territories
Israeli settlement

References

Israeli settlements in the Golan Heights
Golan Regional Council
Moshavim
Populated places in Northern District (Israel)
Populated places established in 1978
1978 establishments in the Israeli Military Governorate